The 2017–18 Savannah State Tigers basketball team represented Savannah State University during the 2017–18 NCAA Division I men's basketball season. The Tigers, led by 13th-year head coach Horace Broadnax, played their home games at Tiger Arena in Savannah, Georgia as members of the Mid-Eastern Athletic Conference. With a win over South Carolina State on March 1, 2018, the Tigers earned a share of the MEAC regular season championship.  They finished the season 15–17, 12–4 in MEAC play, finishing in a three-way tie for first place. Due to tie-breaking procedures, the Tigers received the No. 3 seed in the MEAC tournament, where they lost to North Carolina Central in the quarterfinals.

The Tigers were initially ruled to be ineligible for postseason play for a second consecutive season due to APR violations. However, the NCAA granted the Tigers a waiver allowed them to participate in postseason play.

The season marked the second to last season for the Tigers in Division I as they will rejoin Division II following the 2018–19 season.

In 2019, 10 wins were vacated due to academic certification errors.

Previous season
The Tigers finished the 2016–17 season 13–16, 10–6 in MEAC play to finish in fifth place. The Tigers were ineligible for postseason play due to APR violations.

Roster

Schedule and results

|-
!colspan=9 style=| Exhibition

|-
!colspan=9 style=| Non-conference regular season

|-
!colspan=9 style=| MEAC regular season

|-
!colspan=9 style=| MEAC tournament

References

Savannah State Tigers basketball seasons
Savannah State
Savannah State Tigers basketball team
Savannah State Tigers basketball team